Moorestown is the Intel Corporation's handheld MID and smartphone platform based on Lincroft system-on-a-chip with an Atom processor core, Langwell input/output Platform Controller Hub (I/O PCH), and a Briertown Power Management IC. Announced in 2010, the platform was demonstrated running Moblin Linux.

The Moorestown platform introduced the Simple Firmware Interface (SFI), a lightweight alternative to ACPI. In Linux 5.12, support for SFI, which was previously marked as obsolete, was removed from the kernel by Intel.

See also
 List of Intel Atom microprocessors#"Lincroft" (45 nm)

References

External links
 http://anandtech.com/show/3696/intel-unveils-moorestown-and-the-atom-z600-series-the-fastest-smartphone-processor

Computing platforms